Stephen T. Ayers (born 1962), FAIA, LEED AP, is an American architect who served as the 11th Architect of the Capitol, from 2010 to 2018.

Ayers has been a Fellow of the National Academy of Public Administration since 2020.

Biography
Ayers served in the United States Air Force from 1985 to 1990. and a licensed architect in the State of California.

In February 2007, Ayers assumed the office as Acting Architect.

On May 12, 2010, Ayers was unanimously confirmed as permanent Architect by the United States Senate.

Ayers was the first Architect of the Capitol to be certified as an Accredited Professional in the U.S. Green Building Council's Leadership in Energy and Environmental Design (LEED) program. He has been seeking to reduce energy consumption on Capitol Hill.

In 2011, Ayers received the Carroll H. Dunn Award of Excellence from the Construction Industry Institute. He retired from the role of Architect of the Capitol on November 23, 2018.

See also
Architect of the Capitol

References

Bibliography

External links

1962 births
19th-century American architects
Architects of the United States Capitol
Living people
University of Maryland, College Park alumni
People from Roanoke, Virginia
20th-century American architects
Fellows of the United States National Academy of Public Administration